The Super Regional round of the 2021 NCAA Division I baseball tournament were eight best-of-three-games series to determine the participating teams of the 2021 College World Series. These matchups were:

 (1) Arkansas Razorbacks (Fayetteville Regional winner) vs. NC State Wolfpack (Ruston Regional winner): NC State wins series 2–1.
 (8) Texas Tech Red Raiders (Lubbock Regional winner) vs. (9) Stanford Cardinal (Stanford Regional winner): Stanford wins series 2–0.
 (5) Arizona Wildcats (Tucson Regional winner) vs. (12) Ole Miss Rebels (Oxford Regional winner): Arizona wins series 2–1.
 (4) Vanderbilt Commodores (Nashville Regional winner) vs. (13) East Carolina Pirates (Greenville Regional winner): Vanderbilt wins series 2–0.
 (2) Texas Longhorns (Austin Regional winner) vs.  (Gainesville Regional winner): Texas wins series 2–0.
 (7) Mississippi State Bulldogs (Starkville Regional winner) vs. (10) Notre Dame Fighting Irish (South Bend Regional winner): Mississippi State wins series 2–1.
 Dallas Baptist Patriots (Fort Worth Regional winner) vs. Virginia Cavaliers (Columbia Regional winner): Virginia wins series 2–1.
 (3) Tennessee Volunteers (Knoxville Regional winner) vs. LSU Tigers (Eugene Regional winner): Tennessee wins series 2–0.

The higher seeded team of each series hosted all three games. The higher seed team was designated as the home team in Games 1 and (if necessary) 3, while the lower seeded team was the designated home team in game 2. The only exception this year was the series between Dallas Baptist and Virginia, which was held at Founders Park in Columbia, South Carolina.

Summary

Fayetteville – Arkansas Razorbacks vs. NC State Wolfpack

Lubbock – Texas Tech Red Raiders vs. Stanford Cardinal

Tucson – Arizona Wildcats vs. Ole Miss Rebels

Nashville – Vanderbilt Commodores vs. East Carolina Pirates

Austin – Texas Longhorns vs. South Florida Bulls

Starkville – Mississippi State Bulldogs vs. Notre Dame Fighting Irish

Columbia – Dallas Baptist Patriots vs. Virginia Cavaliers

Knoxville – Tennessee Volunteers vs. LSU Tigers

Fayetteville – Arkansas vs. NC State

Game 1 

Patrick Wicklander got the start for Arkansas. He went six innings while striking out six batters. NC State's starter, Reid Johnston struggled allowing seven runs in three innings.
Jose Torres opened the scoring for NC State with a solo home-run in the top of the second inning, but Arkansas responded with a three-run inning thanks to Robert Moore's two-run home-run. Cullen Smith opened the flood gates with a grand slam the following inning. Arkansas added six in the sixth inning and five in the eighth inning. NC State tacked on a run in the ninth, but ultimately fell 21–2 in game 1.

Game 2 

NC State sent Sam Highfill to the mound in a possible elimination game to go up against Lael Lockhart. Arkansas took an early lead on a two-run home run from Charlie Welch. However, NC State got homers from Jose Torres, Luca Tresh, and Vojtech Mensik in the fourth inning to take a 5–2 lead. NC State added one more in the sixth. A home run from Brady Slavens, a throwing error, and an RBI single from Jalen Battles cut the lead to 1. Evan Justice came in to close the door on Arkansas in game 2.

Game 3 

Arkansas ace Kevin Kopps suffered his first loss of the season after allowing a solo home run in the top of the ninth to Jose Torres, his third of the series. NC State will advance to the 2021 College World Series after upsetting  1 Arkansas. This marks their first College World Series appearance since 2013. Arkansas had not lost a three-game series since May 2019.

Composite line score
2021 Fayetteville Super Regional (2–1): NC State Wolfpack defeated Arkansas Razorbacks.

Lubbock – Texas Tech vs. Stanford 
Texas Tech and Stanford previously met in the 1995 Midwest I Regional. They played 3 times. Texas Tech won the first matchup 3–1. Stanford won both games in the Regional Final 3–2 and 6–5.

Game 1 

Brendan Beck threw a career-high 13 strikeouts in 7.1 IP for the Cardinal. Texas Tech's starter Chase Hampton did not experience the same success, as he allowed four runs in 3.2 innings. Stanford's four-run first inning started because of Tim Tawa's home run. The Stanford offense was all over the Tech bullpen, as they won Game 1 by a score of 15–3.

Game 2 

Stanford turned to junior right-handed pitcher, Alex Williams, for a chance to advance to the 2021 College World Series. Williams was excellent allowing two hits and no runs in his start. The Stanford offense was led by Brock Jones via the home run as he hit three on the day. Stanford sweeps Texas Tech to advance to the College World Series for the first time since 2008.

Composite line score
2021 Lubbock Super Regional (2–0): Texas Tech Red Raiders defeated Stanford Cardinal.

Tucson – Arizona vs. Ole Miss 

Arizona and Ole Miss have met just once in NCAA tournament competition. It came in the 1956 College World Series, which saw Arizona take a 7–3 win to eliminate Ole Miss.

Game 1

Game 2

Game 3

Composite line score
2021 Tucson Super Regional (2–1): Arizona Wildcats defeated Ole Miss Rebels.

Nashville – Vanderbilt vs. East Carolina 

Vanderbilt and East Carolina have met only once at the 1974 NCAA Division I baseball tournament.

Game 1

Game 2

Composite line score
2021 Nashville Super Regional (2–0): Vandebilt Commodores defeated East Carolina Pirates.

Austin – Texas vs. South Florida 
This was the first time that Texas and South Florida have played in baseball.

Game 1 

Ty Madden, the starting pitcher for Texas, went 6  scoreless innings. Jake Jesiek started on the mound for South Florida in their first-ever Super Regional game. Texas held their early lead until the top of the 9th, when Daniel Cantu and Drew Butcher launched home runs to even the game at 3. A two-out fielding error by South Florida in the bottom of the ninth put the winning run on first base. The next batter, Eric Kennedy, hit a double to centerfield to secure a walk-off win for the Longhorns.

Game 2 

Facing elimination, South Florida turned to Collin Sullivan, who only lasted 1.2 innings. Texas's Tristan Stevens picked up the win going 5.2 innings. South Florida struck first with two runs in the bottom of the first. Texas responded with four runs in the second and two more in the third. The Texas offense would continue to pile on as they won 12–4. Texas will advance to the 2021 College World Series, making their 37th appearance.

Composite line score
2021 Austin Super Regional (2–0): Texas Longhorns defeated .

Starkville – Mississippi State vs. Notre Dame 

Mississippi State and Notre Dame previously met in the 1993 East Regional and 2000 Starkville Regional. in 1993, Notre Dame won 15–1, while the 2000 Starkville Regional saw the teams matchup three times. Mississippi State won the first matchup 8–1. However, Notre Dame stormed back to the Regional Final and won 7–0, but fell in the ensuing game 10–9, as Mississippi State advanced to the Super Regionals.

Game 1 

The crowd of 14,385 is the largest Super Regional crowd in NCAA tournament history.

Game 2

Game 3

Composite line score
2021 Starkville Super Regional (2–1): Mississippi State Bulldogs defeated Notre Dame Fighting Irish.

Columbia – Dallas Baptist vs. Virginia

Game 1

Game 2

Game 3

Composite line score
2021 Columbia Super Regional (2–1): Virginia Cavaliers defeated Dallas Baptist Patriots.

Knoxville – Tennessee vs. LSU

Game 1

Game 2

Composite line score
2021 Knoxville Super Regional (2–0): Tennessee Volunteers defeated LSU Tigers.

References

External links
Official Bracket at NCAA.com

Super Regional